In enzymology, a phenylacetaldoxime dehydratase is an enzyme that catalyzes the chemical reaction

(Z)-phenylacetaldehyde oxime  phenylacetonitrile + H2O

Hence, this enzyme has one substrate, (Z)-phenylacetaldehyde oxime, and two products, phenylacetonitrile and H2O.

This enzyme belongs to the family of lyases, specifically the "catch-all" class of lyases that do not fit into any other sub-class.  The systematic name of this enzyme class is (Z)-phenylacetaldehyde-oxime hydro-lyase (phenylacetonitrile-forming). Other names in common use include PAOx dehydratase, arylacetaldoxime dehydratase, OxdB, and (Z)-phenylacetaldehyde-oxime hydro-lyase.  This enzyme participates in styrene degradation.

References

 
 

EC 4.99.1
Enzymes of unknown structure